List
Academic computer science departments
Computer